Artem Ivanov (born December 16, 1987 in Dnipropetrovsk) is a Ukrainian (until 2014) and Russian (since 2014) weightlifter. His best total is 420 kg (190 snatch + 230 clean and jerk - Ukrainian Championships 2012). If this had not been completed at a domestic event, it would have represented a substantial increase on the world record at this weight division. At the 2012 Olympic Games, Ivanov did not appear for his weigh-in, prompting speculation of injury, and leaving rival Ilya Ilyin to comfortably retain his title.

References

External links

1987 births
Living people
Ukrainian male weightlifters
Olympic weightlifters of Ukraine
Weightlifters at the 2008 Summer Olympics
Sportspeople from Dnipro
Russian male weightlifters
World Weightlifting Championships medalists
Ukrainian emigrants to Russia
Naturalised citizens of Russia
European Weightlifting Championships medalists